The 1942 New Year Honours in New Zealand were appointments by King George VI to various orders and honours in recognition of war service by New Zealanders. The awards celebrated the passing of 1941 and the beginning of 1942, and were announced on 1 January 1942. No civilian awards were made.

The recipients of honours are displayed here as they were styled before their new honour.

Order of the British Empire

Knight Commander (KBE)
Military division, additional
 Major-General Bernard Cyril Freyberg   – New Zealand Military Forces.

Commander (CBE)
Military division, additional
 Colonel (temporary Brigadier) Norman William McDonald Weir – New Zealand Staff Corps; of Wellington.

Officer (OBE)
Military division, additional
 Wing Commander John Thomas Brown – Royal Air Force; of Christchurch.
 Surgeon Commander Harold Keith Corkhill    – Royal New Zealand Naval Volunteer Reserve; of Auckland.

Member (MBE)
Military division, additional
 Lieutenant and Quartermaster Alfred Brant – New Zealand Permanent Staff, New Zealand Military Forces; of Auckland.
 Charles Henry James Stone – warrant engineer, Royal Navy.
 Acting Squadron Leader Odling Ross Toyne – Royal Air Force.
 Warrant Officer George Wilfred Trott – Royal New Zealand Air Force; of Auckland.

British Empire Medal (BEM)
Military division, for meritorious service
 Engine Room Artificer (1st Class) Charles Thomas Bond – Royal Navy; of Auckland.

Bar to Air Force Cross (AFC)
 Acting Wing Commander Arthur Edmund Clouston  – Royal Air Force.

Air Force Cross (AFC)
 Acting Squadron Leader John Adams  – Royal New Zealand Air Force.
 Wing Commander George Ernest Watt – Royal Air Force.

Air Force Medal (AFM)
 Sergeant Maurice Kidson – air observer, Royal New Zealand Air Force.
 Sergeant Daniel Paul Phillips – Royal New Zealand Air Force.

Distinguished Service Cross (DSC)
 Lieutenant Charles George Palmer – Royal New Zealand Naval Volunteer Reserve.
 Lieutenant-Commander Frederick George Tidswell – Royal New Zealand Naval Volunteer Reserve.

Mention in despatches
 Acting Flight Lieutenant Thomas James Desmond Baber – Royal New Zealand Air Force.
 Sergeant Kenneth Keremehana Bevan – Royal New Zealand Air Force.
 Flight Lieutenant Matthew Richard Cable – Royal Air Force Volunteer Reserve.
 Sergeant Valton William James Crook  – Royal New Zealand Air Force.
 Acting Flight Lieutenant Alexander James Muir Fabian – Royal Air Force Volunteer Reserve.
 Sergeant Martin Edmund Coston Fell – Royal New Zealand Air Force.
 Flying Officer Douglas Veale Gilmour – Royal Air Force.
 Acting Wing Commander Patrick Geraint Jameson  – Reserve of Air Force Officers.
 Wing Commander Geoffrey Twyford Jarman  – Royal Air Force.
 Acting Group Captain Lancelot Elworthy Jarman  – Royal Air Force.
 Sergeant Gordon Fraser Jones – Royal New Zealand Air Force.
 Acting Group Captain Hector Douglas McGregor  – Royal Air Force.
 Flying Officer George Ewart Milnes – Royal Air Force.
 Acting Flight Lieutenant John Edward Stewart Morton – Royal Air Force.
 Acting Squadron Leader Keith Day Pearce Murray  – Royal Air Force Volunteer Reserve.
 Acting Flight Lieutenant Raymond John Newton – Royal New Zealand Air Force.
 Acting Squadron Leader John Ramsay St John – Reserve of Air Force Officers.
 FLight Lieutenant Joseph Cunningham Simpson – Royal Air Force.
 Flight Lieutenant William Stanley Simpson  – Royal New Zealand Air Force.
 Flying Officer James Victor Verran  – Royal Air Force.
 Flight Lieutenant Wilfred Maurice Chalk Williams  – Royal New Zealand Air Force.

References

New Year Honours
1942 awards
1942 in New Zealand
New Zealand awards